Chetina is a genus of bristle flies in the family Tachinidae.

Species
Chetina longicauda Kugler, 1974
Chetina setigena Rondani, 1856

References

Exoristinae
Tachinidae genera
Diptera of Asia
Diptera of Europe
Taxa named by Camillo Rondani